St. George is a community in the Rural Community of Eastern Charlotte, in Charlotte County, New Brunswick, Canada; it was a town until the end of 2022. It is located where the Magaguadavic River flows into the Bay of Fundy, between Passamaquoddy Bay and Lake Utopia.

The area was surveyed in 1786. First called Magaguadavic, it was renamed Granite Town after the nearby red-granite quarries. In 1829 it was renamed to the current name, and a post office was established.  By 1898 the town's port served the Shore Line Railway, and there were three hotels, four churches, 22 stores, and two mills. It was incorporated as a town in 1904.

During the Second World War, two military bases were opened near the town: A Canadian Army training base known as "Camp Utopia" and a RCAF/RAF Air Station at Pennfield Ridge. By the late 1950s, both bases were closed; Camp Utopia relocated to Camp Gagetown, later CFB Gagetown, and the airfield at Pennfield Ridge served as the first commercial airport for the city of Saint John. From 1983 to 1985, Adex Mining Inc. operated a tungsten/molybdenum mine 40 km north of the town, at Mount Pleasant. Primary employers are aquaculture and a J. D. Irving lumber mill, Lake Utopia Paper.

St. George Power runs a hydroelectric generating station on the Magaguadavic River. It has an installed capacity of 15 MW. It is a run of the river plant, meaning there is no water storage in reservoirs as there is at the Mactaquac Dam.

On 1 January 2023, St. George amalgamated with the village of Blacks Harbour and all or part of five local service districts to form the incorporated rural community of Eastern Charlotte. The community's name remains in official use.

Demographics

Language

References

External links
 Official site

Communities in Charlotte County, New Brunswick
Former towns in New Brunswick
Mining communities in New Brunswick
2023 disestablishments in New Brunswick
Populated places disestablished in 2023